Hogzilla (a portmanteau of hog and Godzilla) was a male hybrid of wild hog and domestic pig that was shot and killed by Chris Griffin in Alapaha, Georgia, United States, on June 17, 2004, on Ken Holyoak's fish farm and hunting reserve. It was originally widely considered a hoax.

The animal's remains were exhumed in early 2005 and studied by forensic scientists for a documentary for the National Geographic Channel. DNA testing was performed, revealing that Hogzilla was a hybrid of wild boar and domestic pig (Hampshire breed). However, compared to most wild boars and domestics, Hogzilla was still an unusually large specimen.

See also
 List of individual pigs

References

2004 animal deaths
Berrien County, Georgia
Deaths by firearm in Georgia (U.S. state)
Individual animals in the United States
Individual pigs
Mammal hybrids